Orchids to You is a 1935 American drama film directed by William A. Seiter and starring John Boles, Jean Muir and Charles Butterworth. The screenplay concerns a flower shop owner and a married attorney who begin a romance after meeting in court.

Partial cast
 John Boles as Thomas Bentley  
 Jean Muir as Camellia Rand  
 Charles Butterworth as Teddy Stuyvesant  
 Ruthelma Stevens as Evelyn Bentley  
 Harvey Stephens as George Draper  
 Arthur Lake as Joe 
 Spring Byington as Alice Draper  
 Sidney Toler as Nick Corsini  
 John Qualen as Smith  
 Patricia Farr as Polly  
 Arthur Treacher as Roger Morton

References

Bibliography
 Solomon, Aubrey. The Fox Film Corporation, 1915-1935: A History and Filmography. McFarland, 2011.

External links
 

1935 romantic drama films
1935 films
20th Century Fox films
American black-and-white films
American romantic drama films
Films directed by William A. Seiter
Films scored by Arthur Lange
1930s English-language films
1930s American films